Gariépy is a surname mostly found in North America. The most ancient known bearer of the name is Jean Gariépy who lived in Montfort-en-Chalosse, Gascony, France, from 1568 to 1609. His son, François Gariépy, came to Nouvelle-France where he married Marie Houdin in August 1657. Their children are the ancestors of the Gariépy of North America.

The surname Gariépy comes from the Basque surname Garibay. The Gariépy surname has many written forms like Guerepy, Garriépy, Gariépi, Guariépy, Gariépie, Garriépi, Garguépi, Garriépie, Guaryby, Kariépy and Gardipee. The name is usually written without accent (i.e. Gariepy) in the English-speaking parts of Canada and in the United States.

Gariépy may refer to:

 Annie Gariepy, Canadian Cyclist
 Charles Gariepy Canadian Alderman
 Henry Gariepy, writer
 Jean-François Gariépy, academic
 Joseph Gariépy (1852–1927), Canadian politician
 Ray Gariepy (1929-2012), Canadian ice hockey defenseman
 Wilfrid Gariépy (1877–1960), Canadian politician
 Yvon Gariepy Master of Royal Canadian Mint, 1975–1981

It may also refer to:
 Gariépy (Edmonton), West Edmonton, Alberta, Canada

References